Peter Barsymes (fl. ca. 540 – ca. 565) was a senior Byzantine official, associated chiefly with public finances and administration, under Byzantine emperor Justinian I.

Aside from contemporary official documents, the chief source for his life is the historian Procopius, whose treatment of Barsymes in the Secret History is extremely hostile. A native of Syria, he was, according to Procopius, originally a banker. At some point he gained an office in the staff of the praetorian prefecture of the East, before being appointed, some time around 540, to the post of comes sacrarum largitionum ("Count of the Sacred Largess", i.e. minister for the public treasury). In this function he was awarded the titles of honorary consul and patrician. In 543, he succeeded Theodotus as praetorian prefect of the East, a post he held until 546. In order to replenish the treasury, he restarted the sale of offices, but his speculation with the grain supply of the capital failed, and he was dismissed soon after by Justinian. Enjoying the protection of empress Theodora, according to Procopius, he was soon (in 547) reappointed to his old office as comes sacrarum largitionum. He remained in office until ca. 550 or perhaps until 555, when he was reappointed as Praetorian prefect of the East. He kept this post until 562.

Sources 
 

6th-century deaths
6th-century Byzantine people
Byzantine officials
Comites sacrarum largitionum
Ministers of Justinian I
Patricii
Praetorian prefects of the East
Year of birth uncertain